The Forbidden Way is a 1920 German silent film directed by Henrik Galeen and starring Lupu Pick, John Gottowt, and Edith Posca.

Cast

References

Bibliography

External links

1920 films
Films of the Weimar Republic
German silent feature films
Films directed by Henrik Galeen
German black-and-white films
1920s German films